Lyndale Park is a Minneapolis city park on the northeast side of Lake Harriet. It is next to Lakewood Cemetery, southeast of Bde Maka Ska. It is part of an enormous greenspace circling through Minneapolis called the Grand Rounds Scenic Byway, and is one of the seven districts within, called the Chain of Lakes. The other six districts within Grand Rounds are the Downtown Riverfront, Mississippi River, Minnehaha, Theodore Wirth, Victory Memorial Parkway, and Northeast. The  park system is designed so that every home in Minneapolis is within six blocks of green space.

Immediately adjacent to the Peace Garden is the Thomas Sadler Roberts Bird Sanctuary.

Arboretum
The park's arboretum was conceived by Theodore Wirth in 1907 and by 1915 the bulk of the collection had been planted.  Many of the original plantings still survive.  Major collections include roses and crabapple trees.  Heritage trees, defined as the oldest or largest specimen found within the city limits, include the Cucumber Magnolia, River Birch, Golden Larch, Mugo Pine, White Fir, Austrian Pine, Japanese Yew, and Wafer Ash.

Rose Gardens
This is the second oldest public rose garden in the United States and was designed by the Park Superintendent Theodore Wirth. Construction of the garden occurred during 1907-08. An official AARS (All America Rose Selections) test rose garden was added in 1946. The garden features more than 4000 plants and 250 species. Two fountains border the garden; the bronze-and-marble Heffelfinger Fountain is from the Villa Montalto near Florence, Italy and donated to the Park Board by Frank Heffelfinger in 1944. There is a cherub surfing on a dolphin at the top, surrounded by satyrs. Human faces on the pedestal base show the progress of age.

Perennial Garden and Perennial Trial Garden
This garden was built in 1962-63 when the Phelps (turtle) fountain was moved from the downtown Gateway to the east end of this garden. Two long perennial borders edge this garden and six annual beds are featured between these borders. Many wedding ceremonies are performed in this garden area located between the Phelps and Heffelfinger fountains.

The Perennial Trial Garden is a recent addition to the Lyndale Park, and features perennials that are tested over several seasons for hardiness, disease resistance and other features. Maintained by the volunteers from the Men's Garden Club of Minneapolis, this garden is a meandering border that begins near King's Highway and follows the wood line down towards the Peace Garden. This perennial trial garden is planted in the area once occupied by an elaborate perennial border that was first installed in 1925 and later abandoned in the 1960s.

Thomas Sadler Roberts Bird Sanctuary

Primarily a sanctuary for migratory songbirds in the spring, the warblers are the primary attraction. The Minnesota Audubon Society offers free tours every Tuesday at 9a during April and May.  It is also a quiet and peaceful nature walk in the midst of the city.  The main entrance to the sanctuary is in the Lyndale Park Gardens parking lot, and trails through that back of the Peace Garden.  Named for Thomas Sadler Roberts, M.D., D.Sc. (1858–1946), Founding Member of the Minneapolis Young Naturalists Society, and the American Ornithologists' Union, and member of the Minnesota Ornithologists' Union.

Lyndale Farmstead Park
Another park with a similar name, Lyndale Farmstead Park, is a separate park located between West 38th Street and West 40th Street on Bryant Avenue South.  Lyndale Farmstead Park contains a recreation center and the Theodore Wirth house, Theodore Wirth House-Administration Building.  The house is on the National Register of Historic Places.

Image gallery Arboretum 

North of the arboretum is the Peace Garden.  In 1998 the rock garden was formally renamed the Lyndale Park Peace Garden.

Image gallery Peace Garden

See also
Biography of Dr. Thomas Sadler Roberts

External links
 Lyndale Park Gardens
 Lyndale Farmstead Park

Parks in Minneapolis
Regional parks in Minnesota
Botanical gardens in Minnesota
Peace parks
Arboreta in Minnesota